Aaran Franklyn Lines (born 21 December 1976) is a New Zealand retired association football player and former head coach of the Western New York Flash. He represented New Zealand at international level.

Club career
Born in Lower Hutt, New Zealand, Lines moved to Germany at the age of 16 to join SV Werder Bremen's youth team of the German Bundesliga, following his appearance playing in an  U-17 tournament in Japan. Lines played 80 games with the Werder Bremen youth team and 60 games with the reserve team.

In 1997, Lines moved to VfL Osnabrück where he appeared in over 80 matches in the first and second Bundesliga. At the start of the new century, the New Zealand native headed back home to play in the newly launched A-League for the Auckland Football Kingz (now the Wellington Phoenix). Following his stint in the A-League, Lines returned to Europe where he played for Dresdner SC of the 2. Bundesliga, and Ruch Chorzów and Arka Gdynia of the Polish first division.

Lines then headed to America to play for the Portland Timbers of the USL, and in 2006 made the move to Rochester, NY to play for the Rochester Rhinos. Lines appeared in over 40 matches for the Rhinos in the last two years of his career, including the 2006 USL Championship match.

International career
Lines played representative age group football for New Zealand, making ten New Zealand U17, eight New Zealand U20 and nine New Zealand U23 appearances before making his full New Zealand debut in a 1–0 win over Tahiti on 25 September 1998.

He was included in the New Zealand side for the 1999 Confederations Cup finals tournament in Mexico where he featured in all three group games, and again for the 2003 Confederations Cup finals tournament in France where he made a single appearance against Japan.

Lines ended his international playing career with 31 official full international caps and four goals to his credit, his final cap an appearance in a 2–0 win over Fiji on 6 June 2004.

Coaching career
After his two seasons with the Rochester Rhinos, Lines retired and accepted a coaching position with the semi-professional expansion W-League franchise Buffalo Flash. Lines led the Buffalo Flash to an impressive 10–3–3 record in their inaugural season and a trip to the second round of the playoffs. In only his second year of coaching, he led the squad to an undefeated season and a W-League Championship defeating the Vancouver Whitecaps 3–1 in Santa Clarita, CA. Lines was named the Fieldturf 2010 Coach of the Year.

The WNY Flash joined Women's Professional Soccer as an expansion club in September 2010. Lines led a squad featuring five-time FIFA World Player of the Year Marta, Christine Sinclair and Alex Morgan to the 2011 WPS title. In 2013 the WNY Flash was announced as one of eight franchises selected by US Soccer to compete in the NWSL. Lines led the Flash, with a roster including Abby Wambach and Carli Lloyd to the regular-season title with a record of 9-4-8. In the semi-final playoff game, the Flash beat Sky Blue 2–0  at Sahlen's Stadium in Rochester, NY. The Flash lost the championship 2–0 to the Portland Thorns FC in front of over 8,000 fans. Lines focuses on the development of the WNY Flash Youth Academy. He continues to manage Sahlen's Sports Park indoor facility and oversee the direction of the Euros and Champions Soccer series based in Elma, NY.

Career statistics

Scores and results list New Zealand's goal tally first, score column indicates score after each Lines goal.

Managerial statistics
All competitive league games (league and domestic cup) and international matches (including friendlies) are included.

References

External links
 Aaran Lines Interview
 
 

1976 births
Living people
Sportspeople from Lower Hutt
New Zealand association footballers
Association football midfielders
New Zealand international footballers
1998 OFC Nations Cup players
1999 FIFA Confederations Cup players
2002 OFC Nations Cup players
2003 FIFA Confederations Cup players
2004 OFC Nations Cup players
USL First Division players
National Soccer League (Australia) players
Ekstraklasa players
SV Werder Bremen II players
Kickers Emden players
VfL Osnabrück players
Football Kingz F.C. players
Dresdner SC players
Ruch Chorzów players
Arka Gdynia players
Portland Timbers (2001–2010) players
Rochester New York FC players
National Women's Soccer League coaches
Western New York Flash coaches
New Zealand association football coaches
New Zealand expatriate association footballers
New Zealand expatriate sportspeople in Germany
Expatriate footballers in Germany
New Zealand expatriate sportspeople in Poland
Expatriate footballers in Poland
Women's Professional Soccer coaches